Evgenii Koptelov, (born 24 November 1993 in Volgograd, Volgograd Oblast, Russia) is a Russian swimmer. He won two gold medals at the 2015 Summer Universiade in 100m and 200m butterfly.

Career 
In 2012, Koptelov competed at the 2012 FINA World Swimming Championships (25 m) in Istanbul, Turkey making it to the semi-finals in men's 50 m butterfly. At the 2013 Summer Universiade in Kazan, Koptelov was member of the Russian Team that won gold in men's 4 × 100 m medley (with Vladimir Morozov, Kiril Strelnikov and Andrey Grechin) and a bronze medal in 100 m butterfly. In 2014, Koptelov finished 8th in 200 m butterfly at the 2014 European Championships.

In 2015, at the 2015 Summer Universiade in Gwangju, Koptelov won gold in 200 m butterfly clocking in 1:54.79 and in 100 m butterfly clocking a final time of 51.50 to win his second gold medal. He won his third gold with the Russian team in men's 4 × 100 m medley.

References

External links
Evgenii Koptelov Sports bio
Koptelov Kazan2013 
Koptelov Gwangju2015

1993 births
Living people
Russian male swimmers
Male butterfly swimmers
Male medley swimmers
Olympic swimmers of Russia
Swimmers at the 2016 Summer Olympics
Sportspeople from Volgograd
Universiade medalists in swimming
Universiade gold medalists for Russia
Universiade bronze medalists for Russia
Medalists at the 2013 Summer Universiade
Medalists at the 2015 Summer Universiade